"Venus" is Tackey & Tsubasa's sixth single under the Avex Trax label.

Overview
"Venus" is Tackey & Tsubasa's sixth single, and currently their best selling single, reaching the 300,000 copies sold mark. The a-side song "Venus" was used in commercials for the ringtone service site, Mu-Mo. The b-side song "Kimi no Na wo Yobitai" was used as the ending theme for the TBS show "Zubari Iu wa yo." The other b-side song "Never Ever" was used as the opening theme song for the anime "Capeta."

Sample of the translated lyrics:
Burn, Venus, hotly, Venus
Your eyes scorch my heart
Love is a long silk road
And if I hesitate, you'll want to forget me
Feel, Venus, hotly, Venus
Show me a wind like that of a storm
You know the answer
Let loose the sparkling of your love

Track listing

Regular CD Format
 "Venus" (Hitoshi Haneda) - 4:11
 "" (Takizawa Hideaki) (Mikio Sakai, Hideyuki Obata) - 5:39
 "Never Ever" (Imai Tsubasa) (Kazuko Kobayashi, Shunsuke Yazaki) - 4:23
 "Venus: Korean Version" - 4:11
 "Venus: Chinese Version" - 4:11
 "Venus: Thai Version" - 4:11
 "Venus: karaoke" - 4:10
 ": '06 Remix" - 4:13

Limited CD Format
 "Venus" (Hitoshi Haneda) - 4:09
 "" (Takizawa Hideaki) (Mikio Sakai, Hideyuki Obata) - 5:37
 "Never Ever" (Imai Tsubasa) (Kazuko Kobayashi, Shunsuke Yazaki) - 4:21
 "Venus: Korean Version" - 4:09
 "Venus: Chinese Version" - 4:09
 "Venus: Thai Version" - 4:09
 "Venus: karaoke" - 4:09

CD+DVD Format

CD Portion
 "Venus" (Hitoshi Haneda) - 4:09
 "" (Takizawa Hideaki) (Mikio Sakai, Hideyuki Obata) - 5:37
 "Never Ever" (Imai Tsubasa) (Kazuko Kobayashi, Shunsuke Yazaki) - 4:21
 "Venus: Korean Version" - 4:09
 "Venus: Chinese Version" - 4:09
 "Venus: Thai Version" - 4:09
 "Venus: karaoke" - 4:09

DVD Portion
 "Venus Choreography Video"

Personnel
 Takizawa Hideaki - vocals
 Imai Tsubasa - vocals

TV performances
 ?, 2006 - Music Fighter
 January 19, 2006 - Utaban
 January 29, 2006 - Utawara
 February 17, 2006 - Music Station
 May 5, 2006 - Music Station

Charts
Oricon Sales Chart (Japan)

RIAJ Certification
As of February 2006, "Venus" has been certified platinum for shipments of over 250,000 by the Recording Industry Association of Japan.

References 
 Translated Lyrics
 

2006 singles
Tackey & Tsubasa songs
Oricon Weekly number-one singles